This is a list of number-one hits by non-British European artists in the U.S. Billboard Hot 100 chart. It excludes number-one hits by British artists that can be found in the list of songs by British artists which reached number-one in the United States.

Trivia
The European country with the highest number of US number ones is the United Kingdom with 188. Sweden follows with 7.
The European country whose artists have appeared in the top spot on the Hot 100 for the most weeks is again the UK, followed by Spain (19 weeks) and Ireland (15).
Apart from the UK, the European countries with the largest number of acts to reach number one in the US are Germany (all except Kim Petras as West Germany) and Sweden with 4. Ireland and the Netherlands have three each, and Belgium and Spain have two. Austria had one act reach number one in the pre-Hot 100 era and one in the Hot 100 era.
The only non-UK European acts with multiple US number one hits are:
 Roxette (4)
 Milli Vanilli (3)
 Enrique Iglesias (2)
 U2 (2)

Most number ones by country

Most number ones by artist

See also
List of Billboard Hot 100 number-ones by Australian artists
List of Billboard Hot 100 number-ones by Canadian artists
List of Billboard Hot 100 number-ones by British artists

Notes
¹-Pre-Hot 100 hit included on this list for completeness
 Pitbull is Cuban and Ne-Yo is American
Singer/songwriter Gotye is a Belgian-Australian artist. He was born in Bruges but he moved to Australia  when he was 2 years old.

European
Lists of artists by record chart achievement